Viktor Mykhailovych Pynzenyk (born 15 April 1954) is a Ukrainian politician, economist, and former Minister of Finance. He is the former leader of the Reforms and Order Party.

Pynzenyk has been credited with economic reform in post-Soviet Ukraine, helping to transform the country into a market economy and introducing Ukraine's new currency, the hryvnia in September 1996, with the help of Viktor Yushchenko, at the time Chairman of the National Bank of Ukraine.

Early life
Viktor Pynzenyk was born on April 15, 1954, in Smolohovytsia, in the westernmost Zakarpattia Oblast (province) of the Ukrainian SSR (now Ukraine) to Mykhailo and Mariya Pynzenyk. After completing his secondary education, Pynzenyk studied at the Lviv State University, from which he graduated in 1975 as an economist. He stayed on in the same university until 1979 for the post-graduate work on his dissertation in Economics which he defended in 1980 receiving the degree of Candidate of Science (roughly Ph.D. equivalent). He continued his scientific work in the Moscow State University where he received his Doktor of Science degree in 1989. A year later, Pynzenyk became a professor of economics at his alma mater—the Lviv University.

In 1996, he received an honorary doctorate from the National University of Kyiv-Mohyla Academy.

Political and economic career
Pynzenyk was sworn into Ukrainian parliament on January 4, 1992, and soon afterwards became a member of the economic reforms working group. Later that year, he became the Vice-Prime Minister of Ukraine as well as the Minister of Economy. As minister, Pynzenyk introduced the first economic reforms in the newly independent Ukraine, helping transform the country into a market economy.

In March 1992, Pynzenyk was elected to the second convocation of the parliament as part of the "Reforms" faction, serving his mandate until April 1998. As an MP, he participated in the finance and banking work group. From October 31, 1994 until September 5, 1995, he served as the country's First Vice Prime Minister of Ukraine, and from August 3, 1995 to April 7, 1997—as the Vice Prime Minister of Ukraine.

Viktor was elected to Verkhovna Rada for the third time in the 1998 Ukrainian parliamentary election serving from March 1998 until the next election in 2002. In 2002, Pynzenyk was elected as part of the "Our Ukraine" electoral bloc. Three years later, after the Orange Revolution, Pynzenyk was chosen as the Minister of Economy on February 4, 2005, and served his post until August 2006. Then on November 3, 2007, he became a deputy of the Verkhovna Rada of the sixth convocation as a member of the Reforms and Order Party, which participated in the elections as part of the Yulia Tymoshenko Bloc.

Viktor Pynzenyk served as the Minister of Finance of Ukraine in the Prime Minister Yulia Tymoshenko's Cabinet, elected on December 18, 2007. He offered his resignation on February 12, 2008 because he could not abandon the principles of a balanced budget with a minimum deficit, realistic revenue sources and limits on government borrowing. The Ukrainian Parliament still has to support this resignation. Tymoshenko's reaction to his resignation was: "Not all officials can withstand the challenges of a global economic crisis, not all of them can work under pressure, and respond adequately to challenges. The weakest leave their combat posts and turn to other activities", Tymoshenko also stated: "He was in hospital and was not working for health reasons". President Viktor Yushchenko's reaction to Pynzenyk's resignation was of a different nature: "It is a pity that such people – professional, honest and devoted to state interests are unable to realize their potential being members of the Government, losing such voice is a great misunderstanding and unprofessional policy of the Government. I am assured that the whole range of negative processes in budgetary policy will follow". Pynzenyk, in conversation with United States Ambassador to Ukraine John F. Tefft at a meeting on February 22, 2010 showed "frustration at his inability to convince Tymosehnko to take advantage of the opportunity presented by the 2008–2009 Ukrainian financial crisis to reform” (according to Tefft) and called Tymoshenko's decisions “normally guided by ‘adventurous populism,’” which she saw as a tool to “consolidate power in her own hands.”

On February 17, 2009, the Verkhovna Rada officially dismissed Pynzenyk. Pynzenyk was absent from the voting as he was in hospital.

Pynzenyk withdrawaled from the Reforms and Order Party in April 2010.

Pynzenyk was appointed deputy chairman of the supervisory council of UkrSibbank in February 2011.

Pynzenyk returned to national politics as number 7 on the party list of UDAR of Vitaliy Klychko for the 2012 Ukrainian parliamentary election. He was (re-)elected into parliament.

In the 2014 Ukrainian parliamentary election he was again re-elected into parliament; this time after placing 17th on the electoral list of Petro Poroshenko Bloc.

Personal life
Despite his career in politics, Viktor Pynzenyk remains a professor at the Lviv University. He has been named an honorary professor of the Kyiv-Mohyla Academy, and the Economics Institute of Ternopil. Additionally, he has been named an "Honored Economist of Ukraine" (as of 2004).

Viktor Pynzenyk is married to Mariya Romanivna (b. 1969), and they have two children: sons Volodymyr (b. 1993) and Vitaliy (b. 2007). He also has two daughters from the previous marriage Olga (b. 1981) and Yulia (b. 1989). Pynzenyk's hobbies include tourism, an interest in music, as well as playing the preferans game. His income declaration for 2006 constituted 265,200 hryvnias ($53,000). He drives a Toyota RAV4 and a Toyota 4Runner.

See also
 Ukrainian Christian Democratic Party

References and footnotes

External links
Official website 
 

1954 births
Living people
People from Zakarpattia Oblast
20th-century Ukrainian economists
Reforms and Order Party politicians
Ukrainian Democratic Alliance for Reform politicians
Economy ministers of Ukraine
Finance ministers of Ukraine
Vice Prime Ministers of Ukraine
First vice prime ministers of Ukraine
Petro Poroshenko Bloc politicians
First convocation members of the Verkhovna Rada
Second convocation members of the Verkhovna Rada
Third convocation members of the Verkhovna Rada
Fourth convocation members of the Verkhovna Rada
Sixth convocation members of the Verkhovna Rada
Seventh convocation members of the Verkhovna Rada
Eighth convocation members of the Verkhovna Rada
21st-century Ukrainian economists